The 2019–20 season was Plymouth Argyle's first season back in EFL League Two following relegation the season before and their 134th year in existence. Along with competing in League Two, the club will also participate in the FA Cup, EFL Cup and EFL Trophy. The season covers the period from 1 July 2019 to 30 June 2020.

On 13 March 2020 the season was temporarily suspended, before being indefinitely suspended on 3 April, due to the COVID-19 pandemic. On 15 May, League Two clubs declared their intention to end the season at 
its current point with immediate effect, with the final table being determined on an unweighted points-per-game basis. The decision meant that Plymouth Argyle, along with champions Swindon Town and Crewe Alexandra would be promoted to League One for the following season.

First-team squad

Statistics

|-
!colspan=14|Players out loan:

|-
!colspan=14|Players who left the club:

|}

Goals record

Disciplinary record

Transfers

Transfers in

Loans in

Loans out

Transfers out

Pre-season
Argyle confirmed their pre-season programme in June 2019.

Competitions

League Two

League table

Results summary

Results by matchday

Matches
On Thursday, 20 June 2019, the EFL League Two fixtures were revealed.

FA Cup

The first round draw was made on 21 October 2019. The second round draw was made live on 11 November from Chichester City's stadium, Oaklands Park.

EFL Cup

The first round draw was made on 20 June. The second round draw was made on 13 August 2019 following the conclusion of all but one first round matches.

EFL Trophy

On 9 July 2019, the pre-determined group stage draw was announced with Invited clubs to be drawn on 12 July 2019.

References

Plymouth Argyle
Plymouth Argyle F.C. seasons